Qanqanlu (also Romanized as Qānqānlū; also known as Ghanqanloo, Kangālu, Kān-i-Ghālu, and Qānqāqlū) is a village in Razan Rural District, in the Central District of Razan County, Hamadan Province, Iran. At the 2006 census, its population was 154, in 34 families.

References 

Populated places in Razan County